José Gutiérrez may refer to:

Arts and entertainment
 José Gutiérrez Alanya (born 1957), better known by his nickname Tongo, Peruvian singer and humorist
 José Gutiérrez de la Vega (1791–1865), Spanish painter
 José Gutiérrez Solana (1886–1945), Spanish painter, engraver and author
 Jose Gutierez Xtravaganza, American dancer and choreographer

Sports
 José Gutiérrez (baseball), (born 1903), Cuban baseball player
 José Enrique Gutiérrez (born 1974), Spanish road racing cyclist
 José Gutiérrez (sailor) (born 1992), Venezuelan sailor
 José Gutiérrez (footballer, born 1993), Ecuadorian football midfielder
 José Gutiérrez (racing driver) (born 1996), Mexican racing driver
 Último Guerrero (José Gutiérrez Hernández, born 1972), Mexican wrestler

Others
 José Gutiérrez de la Concha, 1st Marquess of Havana (1809–1895), Spanish noble, general, and politician
 José Gutiérrez de Agüera, Spanish politician
 José Gutiérrez Guerra (1869–1929), Bolivian economist and statesman
 José Antonio Gutiérrez (1980–2003), U.S. Marine lance corporal
 José Ángel Gutiérrez, Texas attorney and university professor